John Paulding (April 5, 1883 – April 15, 1935) was an American sculptor best remembered for his World War I memorials.  Paulding was born in Darke County, Ohio.
He studied sculpture at the Art Institute of Chicago and was to remain in Chicago until his death at an early age in 1935.

At least two of his World War I memorials became very popular and casts of them can be found in many places throughout the United States.

Controversy with E. M. Viquesney
Paulding and sculptor E. M. Viquesney both produced very similar World War I monuments within a few months of each other, resulting in various copyright violation lawsuits.

Works
American Doughboy, 1920.

Ardmore, Oklahoma, at Walter W. Drew's gravesite in Rosehill Cemetery.
Bay City, Michigan
Northampton, Pennsylvania
Olathe, Kansas
Paducah, Kentucky
Pueblo, Colorado
Racine, Wisconsin
Saline, Michigan
Van Buren, Missouri

Second-Lieutenant Francis Lowry Memorial, Fairmount Cemetery, Denver, Colorado, 1921. The fallen aviator after whom Lowry Air Force Base was named.
Major-General James B. McPherson (The Reconnoissance), Memorial Park, McPherson County Courthouse, McPherson, Kansas, 1917.
 Over the Top, 1921.

Albany, Missouri
Amarillo, Texas
Astoria, Oregon
Bolton Landing, New York
Buffalo, New York
Catskill, New York
Chicago, Illinois
Chillicothe, Ohio
Cincinnati, Ohio
Elgin, Illinois
Evanston, Wyoming
Freeburg, Illinois
Jonesboro, Arkansas
Knoxville, Tennessee
Ladysmith, Wisconsin
Leavenworth, Kansas
Llano, Texas
Manitou Springs, Colorado
Marshall, Missouri
Martins Ferry, Ohio
McMinnville, Oregon
Missoula, Montana
Newberry, South Carolina
Norfolk, Nebraska
Onaga, Kansas
Pittsburgh, Pennsylvania
Salem, Oregon (Over the Top to Victory)
South Haven, Michigan
Valentine, Nebraska
Wahpeton, North Dakota
Wautoma, Wisconsin
Wheaton, Illinois 
Williamsport, Maryland
Winner, South Dakota

See also
 Astoria Victory Monument, Astoria, Oregon

References

1883 births
1935 deaths
People from Darke County, Ohio
School of the Art Institute of Chicago alumni
Artists from Park Ridge, Illinois
20th-century American sculptors
20th-century American male artists
American male sculptors
Sculptors from Illinois